The following list is a discography of production by American hip hop record producer and recording artist Mannie Fresh. It includes a list of songs produced, co-produced and remixed by year, album, artist and title.

Billboard Singles Produced
The following are singles produced by Mannie Fresh which appeared on at least one of the Billboard charts. They have their peak position in bold:
1998: "Ha" - Juvenile #68 US
1999: "Back That Azz Up" - Juvenile #19 US
1999: "Bling Bling" - B.G. #36 US
1999: "Tha Block Is Hot" - Lil Wayne #65 US
1999: "I Need a Hot Girl" - Hot Boys #65 US
2000: "U Understand" - Juvenile #89 US
2000: "Get Your Roll On" - Big Tymers #101 US
2000: "Number One Stunna" - Big Tymers #105 US
2000: "Project Chick" - Cash Money Millionaires #47 US
2001: "Set It Off" - Juvenile #65 US
2001: "Momma Got Ass" - Juvenile #65 US
2001: "Shine" - Lil Wayne #96 US
2002: "Still Fly" - Big Tymers #11 US
2002: "Oh Yeah" - Big Tymers #46 US
2002: "Way of Life" - Lil Wayne #71 US
2003: "This Is How We Do" - Big Tymers #97 US
2003: "In My Life" - Juvenile #46 US
2004: "Go D.J." - Lil Wayne #14 US
2004: "Real Big" - Mannie Fresh #79 US
2005: "And Then What" - Young Jeezy #67 US
2006: "Top Back" - T.I. #29 US
2007: "Big Shit Poppin' (Do It)" - T.I. #9 US
2009: "Take Your Shirt Off" - T-Pain #80 US
2018: "Start This Shit Off Right" - Lil Wayne #76 US
2018: "Perfect Strangers" - Lil  Wayne #86 US
2020: "Mahogany" - Lil Wayne #61 US

1987

DJ Mannie Fresh & MC Gregory D - Throw Down
A-Side
01. "Freddie's Back"
02. "Monster Booogie"
03. "Rock Rap"
04. "Bust Down (Ya'll)"

B-Side
01. "Throw Down"
02. "One Monday Morning"
03. "Never 4-Get Were I Come From"
04. "Club Style"
05. "Women Ain't Stupid"

1989

DJ Mannie Fresh & MC Gregory D - D Rules the Nation
01. "Clap To This"
02. "This Is How We Do It"
03. "Call Somebody Else"
04. "Cindy"
05. "We Want The Funk"
06. "Buck Jump Time"
07. "Never Trust A Man"
08. "D Rules The Nation"
09. "Uzi Automatic"
10. "Sneak 'Em"
11. "Hitman"
12. "V.D. Woman"
13. "Perfect 10"

1990

Lil Mac - The Lyrical Midget
01. "I Need Wheels"
04. "Cleo"
12. "Lil Mac Be Clubbin'"

1992

DJ Mannie Fresh & MC Gregory D - The Real Deal or No Deal
01. "10 Years"
02. "Crack Slangas"
03. "Down W/HIV"
04. "Gangsta Life"
05. "Dogg Ass Nigga"
06. "Make The Beat Funky"
07. "Sica Dis Stupid Shit"
08. "Coochie Pleasers"
09. "Hi-School Hoodlums"
10. "Rollin' That"

1993

U.N.L.V. - 6th & Barronne
All Tracks

B-32 "I Need A Bag Of Dope"
All Tracks

Lil Slim The Game is Cold
All Tracks

PxMxWx - Legalize "Pass the Weed"
All Tracks

Ms. Tee - Chillin' on tha Corner
All Tracks

Pimp Daddy - Still Pimpin'
All Tracks

1994

Mr. Ivan - 187 in a Hockey Mask
All Tracks

PxMxWx - High Life
All Tracks

U.N.L.V. - Straight Out tha Gutta
All Tracks
Lil slim - powder shop

1995
Tec 9 of u.n.l.v. 
  Straight from tha ramp!!
    All tracks

B.G. - True Story

01. "True Story"
02. "Get On My Feet"
03. "Start "N" Tha Game"
04. "From Tha 13th To Tha 17th"
05. "Hood Took Me Under"
06. "Down For My Stacks"
07. "Thrill B'G"
08. "Fuck Big Boy"

U.N.L.V. - Mac Melph Calio
All Tracks

Gregory D - Niggaz In Da Boot

04. "5-4-3-2-1"
06. "Freestyle"
08. "Nightmare On Slanga Street"
15. "Strippers Boom "

Kilo G – The Bloody City

 Tired Of Being F*cked With produced by Mannie Fresh
 Coasting produced by Mannie Fresh
 Intro produced by Mannie Fresh
 Pop'em produced by Mannie Fresh

Lil slim - thuggin and pluggin
  All tracks.

1996

Magnolia Shorty-"Monkey On Tha D$Ck"
All Tracks

B.G. - Chopper City
All Tracks

U.N.L.V. - Uptown 4 Life
All Tracks

Pimp Daddy - Pimpin Aint E-Z
All Tracks

Ms. Tee - Female Baller
All Tracks

L.O.G. – G's & Soldiers
02. "G's N' Soldiers" 
05. "S.A.C. Mafia For Life"

1997

B.G. - It's All on U, Vol. 1
All Tracks

B.G. - It's All On U Vol. 2
All Tracks

Hot Boys - Get It How U Live!
All Tracks

Juvenile - Solja Rags
All Tracks

1998

Big Tymers - How You Luv That
All Tracks:

01. "Big Tymers (Intro)"
02. "Playboy (Don't Hate Me)"
03. "Stun'n"
04. "Tear It Up"
05. "Phone Call"
06. "How U Luv That"
07. "Cutlass, Monte Carlo's & Regals"
08. "Millionaire Dream"
09. "Beautiful"
10. "Ballin'"
11. "Top Of The Line Nigga"
12. "Suge & Pac, Puff & Big (6 Fig)"
13. "Preppy Pimp"
14. "Broads"
15. "Try'n 2 Make a Million"
16. "Drivin' Em"
17. "Outro"

Juvenile - 400 Degreez
All Tracks

1999
T-Mac - "Shinin & Big Tymin'"
"Millionaire Playas" (feat. Big Tymers)

B.G. - Chopper City in the Ghetto
All Tracks

Hot Boys - Guerrilla Warfare
All Tracks

Juvenile - Tha G-Code
All Tracks

Lil Wayne - Tha Block Is Hot
All Tracks

Noreaga - Melvin Flynt - Da Hustler
17. "Play That Shit (We Dont' Play That)"

The Notorious B.I.G. - Born Again
04. "Hope You Niggas Sleep" (feat. Hot Boys & Big Tymers)

Funkmaster Flex and Big Kap - The Tunnel
14. "Respect" (feat. Cash Money Millionaires)

2000

B.G. - Checkmate
All Tracks

Big Tymers - I Got That Work
All Tracks

Cash Money Millionaires - Baller Blockin'
All Tracks

Lil Wayne - Lights Out
All Tracks

2001

Mil - Street Scriptures
05. "Ride Out" (feat. B.G., Beanie Sigel & Lil Wayne)

Juvenile - Project English
All Tracks

Mack 10 - Bang or Ball
All Tracks except "Hate in Yo Eyes", "Work", and "Let It Be Known"

Turk - Young & Thuggin'
All Tracks

Official - Telling Our Story
All Tracks (unreleased)

2002

Baby - Birdman
01. "Bird Lady Talkin' (Intro)"
03. "Fly in Any Weather"
04. "Ms. Bird Pageant Pt. 1"
05. "Ms. Bird"
06. "I Got To"
07. "Never Had Nothing"
09. "Ms. Bird Live From Superdome"
10. “What Happen To That Boy”
14. "Hustlas, Pimps, and Thugs"
15. "Fly Away"
16. "Say It Ain't So"
17. "Ms. Bird Pageant Pt. 3"
20. "Ms. Bird Pageant Pt. 4"
22. "Keeps Spinnin'"

Big Tymers - Hood Rich
All Tracks except "Sunny Day", "I'm Coming", and "Greg Street Radio"

Lil Wayne - 500 Degreez
All Tracks

Toni Braxton - More Than a Woman
02. "Give it Back"

2003

Dirty - Keep It Pimp & Gangsta
04. "That's Dirty"

Hot Boys - Let 'Em Burn
01. "Alicia Applefoot" (Intro)
02. "Introduction" (featuring Baby)
03. "My Section"
04. "Stick & Move" (featuring Baby & Lac)
05. "Down Here"
06. "Spin Tha Bend"
07. "My Cousin's New Keyboard" (Skit)
08. "Let 'Em Burn"
09. "Do Whatcha Do" (featuring Baby)
10. "Gangsta Nigga" (featuring T.Q.)
11. "These Hoes" (featuring Mannie Fresh & T.Q.)
12. "3 Strikes"
13. "Jack Who?, Take What?"
14. "Young Riders"
15. "Off Wit' Ya Head" (performed by B.G.)
16. "Up In Tha Hood" (featuring Lac)
17. "Outro"

Boo & Gotti - "Perfect Timing"
01. "Perfect Timing"
02. "Chi-Town"
04. "Bad Chicks At The Bar"
08. "1 Adam 12"
09. "Pimp Poetry Interlude"
10. "Baby Girl"
11. "Chicago"
12. "P.I.M.P. Affair Interlude"
14. "Think..."
17. "Out Here"

Murphy Lee - Murphy's Law
03. "Hold Up" (feat. Nelly)

Big Tymers - Big Money Heavyweight
All Tracks except "Gangsta Girl"

David Banner - MTA2 Baptized In Dirty Water
 14. "So In Love"

Juvenile - Juve the Great
02. "In My Life"
05. "Bounce Back"
07. "It Ain't Mines"
09. "Lil Daddy"
11. "Cock It"

2004

Petey Pablo - Still Writing in My Diary: 2nd Entry
02. "Did You Miss Me" (feat. TQ & Birdman)

Teena Marie - La Doña
02. "Still In Love"

Lil Wayne - Tha Carter
01. "Walk In"
02. "Go D.J." (feat. Mannie Fresh)
03. "This Is the Carter" (feat. Mannie Fresh)
04. "BM J.R."
05. On The Block #1 (produced with Lil' Wayne)
06. "I Miss My Dawgs" (feat. Reel) (produced with Raj Smoove)
08. "On My Own" (feat. Reel)
10. "Cash Money Millionaires"
11. "Inside"
12. "Bring It Back" (feat. Mannie Fresh)
14. "On The Block #2"
15. "Get Down" (feat. Birdman)
16. "Snitch"
17. "Hoes" (feat. Mannie Fresh)
18. "Only Way" (feat. Birdman)
19. "Earthquake" (feat. Jazze Pha)
20. "Ain't That a Bitch"
21. "Walk Out"

T.I. - Urban Legend
09. "The Greatest"

Mannie Fresh - The Mind of Mannie Fresh
All Tracks

2005

Baby - Fast Money
05. "Hug da Block"
15. "Solid Chic"
16. "We Getting It On"
17. "Get Your Shine On"

Webbie - Savage Life
10. "What Is It?"
14. "Come Here Bitch" (feat. Mannie Fresh)

Bun B - Trill
05. "I'm Fresh" (feat. Mannie Fresh)
09. "What I Represent (UGK)"

Chamillionaire - The Sound of Revenge
13. "Fly as the Sky" (feat. Lil Wayne and Rasaq)

Slim Thug - Already Platinum
00. "Diamonds (Remix)" (feat. Young Jeezy, Killa Kyleon, & Slick Pulla)

Trina - Glamorest Life
02. "Don't Trip" (feat. Lil Wayne)
06. "Da Club" (feat. Mannie Fresh)

Young Jeezy - Let's Get It: Thug Motivation 101
05. "And Then What" (feat. Mannie Fresh)

YoungBloodZ - Ev'rybody Know Me
07. "What Tha Biz (If I)" (feat. Mannie Fresh)

Jody Breeze - A Day in the Life of Jody Breeze
06. "White Tees" (feat. Mannie Fresh)

2006

B.G. - The Heart of tha Streetz, Vol. 2 (I Am What I Am)
03. "Move Around"

Chingy - Hoodstar
10. "Brand New Kicks"

Juvenile - Reality Check
15. "Animal"

Sqad Up - We Do This
02. "Parking Lot" (feat. Mannie Fresh)

Pimp C - Pimpalation
12. "Cheat on Yo Man" (feat. Suga and Mannie Fresh)

Tyrese - Alter Ego
07. "What It Is" (feat. Mannie Fresh)

T.I. - King
02. "Front Back" (feat. UGK)
10. "Top Back"

Rich Boy - Bring It To The Block
05. "D-Boyz" (feat. Mannie Fresh)

Trick Daddy - Back by Thug Demand
14. "Chevy" (feat. Young Steff)

2007

Lil Flip - I Need Mine
14. "What It Do" (feat. Mannie Fresh)

Mike Jones - The American Dream
09. "Bonnie & Clyde"
12. "Don't Play Around"

T.I. - T.I. vs. T.I.P.
02. "Big Things Poppin' (Do It)"
05. "Da Dopeman"

2008

Blood Raw - My Life: The True Testimony
04. "Almost There" (feat. Mannie Fresh)

Plies - Da REAList
14. "Pants Hang Low"

Rick Ross - Trilla
02. "All I Have in This World (Japanese Denim)" (feat. Mannie Fresh)

Webbie - Savage Life 2
04. "I Know" (feat. Young Dro)

Dem Franchize Boyz - Our World, Our Way
03. "Mr. Feel Good" (feat. Mannie Fresh)

Drake - "I'm Still Fly" (single)
00. "I'm Still Fly"

2009

Mike Jones - The Voice
08. "Give Me a Call" (feat. Devin the Dude)

Slim Thug - Boss of All Bosses
04. "Show Me Love" (feat. Mannie Fresh)

UGK - UGK 4 Life
05. "The Pimp & The Bun" (feat. Ron Isley)

Gucci Mane - The State vs. Radric Davis
15. "Gingerbread Man" (feat. OJ Da Juiceman)

B.G. - Too Hood 2 Be Hollywood
05. "My Hood" (Feat. Gar & Mannie Fresh)
11. "Chopper City Is An Army"

Mannie Fresh - Return of the Ballin'
All Tracks

T-Pain - Take Your Shirt Off - Single
"Take Your Shirt Off"

2011

Gucci Mane - The Gucci Glacier 3.0
06. "Contagious"

T.I. - F*ck Da City Up
12. "The One"

2012

GOOD Music - Cruel Summer
09. "The One" (Kanye West, Big Sean, 2 Chainz and Marsha Ambrosius) (additional production)

Juvenile - Rejuvenation
01. "Rejuvenation"
02. "Power"
07. "Fall Back"
08. "Bad Guy"
14. "Toast to the Good Life"

TQ - New Music Tuesday
10. "Early This Morning"

Dee-1 - The Focus Tape
Mixtape host

2013

Yasiin Bey & Mannie Fresh - OMFGOD
00. "Black Jesus

Doe B - Baby Jesus
15. "All We Know"

CTE World - Boss Yo Life Up Gang
19. "Outro"

2 Chainz  - B.O.A.T.S. II: Me Time
06. "Used 2"

2014

Turk - Da Real Thugga
06. "Trife Living"

2016

Lil Uzi Vert & Gucci Mane - 1017 vs. The World
03. "Blonde Brigitte"

2017

Big K.R.I.T. – 4eva Is a Mighty Long Time
04. "Subenstein (My Sub IV)"
05. "1999" (featuring Lloyd)

Big Boi – Boomiverse
04. "Follow Deez"

Grace – FMA
08. "From You"
12. "Say"

2018

Webbie & Joeazzy - T4L (Trill 4Life)
01. "It'z Up" (featuring Bun B)

Bun B - Return of the Trill
05. TrapHandz (featuring Yo Gotti and 2 Chainz)

Lil Wayne - Tha Carter V
17. "Start This Shit Off Right" (featuring Mack Maine and Ashanti)
21. "Perfect Strangers"

2020

Lil Wayne - Funeral 

 02. "Mahogany"
 19. "Piano Trap"

References 

Production discographies
Discographies of American artists